Clay Matthews may refer to any one of three generations of American football players:
 Clay Matthews Sr. (1928–2017), former offensive tackle for the San Francisco 49ers
 Clay Matthews Jr. (born 1956), former linebacker for the Cleveland Browns and Atlanta Falcons, son of former
 Clay Matthews III (born 1986), former linebacker for the Green Bay Packers and Los Angeles Rams, son of former